Malbars or Malabars are an ethnic group of South Indian Tamil origin in Réunion, a French island in the Southwest Indian Ocean, The Malbars constitute 25% of the population of Réunion and are estimated to be around 180,000.

There have been people of South Indian origin on the island since the 17th century, and those were mostly from Pondicherry. Most were originally brought in as indentured labourers in the second half of the 19th century and were mostly South Indian Tamils. Since then, the Malbars have developed some patterns of behaviour that are not quite those of their ancestors from Tamil Nadu nor those of the other inhabitants of Réunion.

Etymology
Malbars is derived from the word Malabar, a term which was used often by the French and other Westerners to refer to all Southern Indians, including the Tamils, Malayalees, Telugus and Kannadigas. This term is based on the Malabar region of the present state of Kerala in India This term, applied by the French to Tamil labourers coming to Réunion, has been kept by the latter and others on the island to label their own identity.

History
Indian workers came to Réunion from South India, mostly from French settlements in Tamil Nadu, Pondicherry, and Karaikal. Most of these immigrants were ritually low in the caste system. Hard living conditions at home were the main reason behind their departure to La Réunion. The immigration of indentured workers from South India started in 1827 but it was only after 1848 that indentured immigration began on a big scale.

Acculturation
The French government in Réunion made the first Malbars become Christian. However, many Malbars were only nominally Christian. The Tamil language was lost to language shift.

Recent developments
The Malbars desire to learn their ancestors' culture, and started studying their language and religions especially from Tamil Nadu. Recently many Malbars, particularly those of upper and middle classes, have started to become completely Hindu rather than nominally Christian.

Genetics
A genetic study has shown that the majority of the Indian origins of Malbars lie in the South-east of India. A significantly larger proportion comes from Andhra Pradesh, and Tamil Nadu. The study also showed that 15-20% of the origins of Malbars come from elsewhere than India. Less than 1% comes from Europe.

Notable Malbars
 Jean-Paul Virapoullé is currently Mayor of Saint Andre and first Vice President of the General Council of Réunion.

Tamil temples

 Chinmaya Mission temple, Quartier Francais, Sainte-Suzanne
 Siva Soupramanien temple, Saint-Paul
 Siva-Vishnou-Karli temple, Saint-Paul
 Siva Soupramanien temple, Petit-Bazar on Avenue Ile-of-France, Saint-Andre
 Sri Bala Subramanya temple, Saint Paul
 Temple du Colosse, Saint André
 Thiru Kalimata Temple, Sainte-Marie

See also
 Réunionnais of Indian origin
 Tamil diaspora
 Hinduism in Réunion

Notes

External links
 Indian Diaspora in Réunion
 Réunion Tamils Cavadee

Ethnic groups in Réunion
Indian diaspora in France
Tamil diaspora in Africa